Bolivia has an active Protestant minority of various groups, especially Evangelical Methodists. Other denominations represented in Bolivia included Mennonites. In 1980s Baptist, Seventh-day Adventists, and various Pentecostal denominations gained increasing adherents.

At present, Protestant groups in Bolivia account for somewhere between 16-19% of the population, with most of the demographic concentration being within the poorer Native majority population.